Clutchy Hopkins is purportedly a multi-instrumentalist musician based out of California. His existence has not yet been fully verified, though he is widely believed to be a pseudonym for one of several popular DJs.  The true identity of the person (or people) behind the music is not publicly known.

Recent history
On September 9, 2006, a YouTube video claiming to be documentary footage about Clutchy Hopkins was uploaded.  The video's end credits contain the URL www.misledchildren.com.  Originally, this website featured a 12-track album titled "The Life of Clutchy Hopkins", plus a white-label store that sold the album, a brief description, and contact information for a seemingly random Hotmail address.  The YouTube video's credits also mention a Myspace page which features grainy photos of a ragged-looking bearded man wearing a flannel shirt.

In February 2007, music blog Idolator published a brief post on the music, describing it as "MF Doom-like hip hop instrumentals with India-influenced guitar tracks and some smoother downtempo work that might fool Portishead fans" and speculating that Clutchy might be a pseudonym for DJ Shadow.  Additional attention from Okayplayer and KCRW DJ Jeremy Sole sparked discussion among music bloggers who postulated that Cut Chemist, Madlib, Money Mark or Shawn Lee might be responsible for the music.  Clutchy's true identity was never discovered, but in early 2008, noted funk label Ubiquity Records released "Walking Backwards", a full-length album of new Clutchy music, featuring guest vocals from Darondo.  It was followed by two collaborations with Shawn Lee and the 2009 album "Music Is My Medicine", credited to Clutchy Hopkins and Lord Kenjamin. In April 2010, Ubiquity released another solo album titled "The Storyteller".

Also in 2008, Porter Records released an album titled "Odean Pope and the Misled Children".  While the relationship remains unclear, the sound of the Misled Children is very similar to Clutchy Hopkins, and the URL from the YouTube video suggests a connection.  Another Misled Children album titled "Peoples Market" is listed on AllMusic.

In 2011, Clutchy released his first public work as Magnetite, described by Ubiquity Records as a "top secret project from the Clutchy Hopkins camp", on Ubiquity compilation album "Save The Music: A Compilation For Record Store Day". Later in 2014, he debuted his first album as Magnetite, entitled "Hex" on record label Discos Dead.

Noted graphic artist Jim Mahfood has created artwork and album covers for recent Clutchy Hopkins projects.

In 2012, Clutchy Hopkins and future soul artist Erik Rico collaborated on an upcoming music project for the Animated Cartunes label.

Discography

External links
 Ubiquity Records Artist Page
 [ Allmusic biography]
 Clutchy Hopkins Radio Mix for Mamiko Motto's show on samurai.fm
 Wax Poetics article & Interview
 Popmatters review of Walking Backwards
 OkayPlayer Review of Music Is My Medicine

Year of birth missing (living people)
Living people
American multi-instrumentalists
Ubiquity Records artists